Nicholas Kittrie (died December 9, 2019) was an American legal scholar. He taught at American University's Washington College of Law for five decades, and he was the president of the American Society of Criminology in 1975.

References

External links
Nicholas Kittrie on C-SPAN

2019 deaths
People from Washington, D.C.
Washington College of Law faculty
American criminologists